Union railway station is a railway station under construction in Mont Albert, Victoria. Announced in 2020, the station is scheduled for opening in May 2023 alongside the closure of Mont Albert &  stations, and will be built as part of the Level Crossing Removal Project.

In December 2020, it was announced that Mont Albert and Surrey Hills stations (approximately 750m apart) would be closed, and replaced with a station in between them. This was due to the fact that level crossing removal works on Union Road and Mont Albert Road required a rebuild of the stations, which would have violated rail safety standards as they were located on curved tracks. Moving the stations to straighter track would necessitate moving them closer together, hence the decision to only build one station.

The name of the new station was announced as Union on 23 March 2022, selected both to represent the unity of the two stations and for the nearby Union Road shopping village.

Platforms and services

Union station will have one island platform (Platforms 1 and 2) and a side platform (Platform 3).

It will be serviced by Metro Trains' Lilydale and Belgrave line services.

Platforms 1:
 all stations and limited express services to Flinders Street
 all stations and limited express services to Flinders Street

Platforms 2:

 all stations and limited express services to Lilydale
 all stations and limited express services to Belgrave

Platforms 3:
 weekday all stations and limited express services to Lilydale; weekday all stations services to Blackburn
 weekday all stations and limited express services to Belgrave; weekday all stations services to Blackburn

References

Proposed railway stations in Melbourne

Railway stations scheduled to open in 2023
Railway stations in the City of Whitehorse